Arturo José Bonini (11 November 1943 – 15 March 2022), better known as Arturo Bonín, was an Argentine actor.

Biography 

Although he was born in the porteño neighborhood of Villa Urquiza, he lived his childhood and youth in Villa Ballester, north of Greater Buenos Aires. It is there where he had his first relationship with theater.

Personal life 
Bonín married for the first time and had a son but the relationship ended in divorce after six months. Bonín and his second wife, actress Susana Cart, met in 1971 at the Payró theater. They had one daughter together. On February 9, 1996, they legalized their marriage civilly on the initiative of their children.

References

External links 
 Arturo Bonin on cinenacional.com

1943 births
2022 deaths
Argentine actors
Male actors from Buenos Aires
Illustrious Citizens of Buenos Aires